Qaleh Lut (also Romanized as Qal‘eh Lūt and Qal‘eh-ye Lūt; also known as Ghal‘eh Loot) is a village in Abezhdan Rural District, Abezhdan District, Andika County, Khuzestan Province, Iran. At the 2006 census, its population was 147, in 22 families.

References 

Populated places in Andika County